Drosera callistos is a species of pygmy sundew from Western Australia. The specific epithet callistos is from the Greek word callistos meaning beautiful.

References

Carnivorous plants of Australia
callistos
Eudicots of Western Australia
Caryophyllales of Australia